The Socialist Party (PS) was a political party in Guatemala. The party was formed in 1951 by dissident members of the Revolutionary Action Party.
The Socialist Party sought to become the major rallying ground for non-communist elements supporting the government of President Jacobo Árbenz. It included a number of important labor and peasant leaders, and its principal figure was Augusto Charnaud MacDonald, minister of finance in Arbens cabinet.
In 1952 the party merged with the National Renovation Party, Revolutionary Action Party, National Integrity Party and Popular Liberation Front, forming the Party of the Guatemalan Revolution.

References

Defunct political parties in Guatemala
Socialist parties in Guatemala
Political parties established in 1951
Guatemalan Revolution
1951 establishments in Guatemala
1952 disestablishments in Guatemala
Political parties disestablished in 1952